Thomas F. Basso is an American hedge fund manager. He was president and founder of Trendstat Capital Management. He is the author of two books, Panic-Proof Investing and the self-published The Frustrated Investor. In 1998, he was elected to the board of the National Futures Association.

Education
Basso graduated from Clarkson University in Potsdam, New York in 1974, where he majored in chemical engineering.

Career
Before trading, Basso became an engineer for Monsanto Company. Basso became a registered investment advisor in 1980 and a registered commodities advisor in 1984. He founded Trendstat Capital in 1984, and served as its CEO until his retirement. Retired from active trading in 2003, he is enjoying managing his own portfolios and helping new traders learn their craft.

References

Notes

Further reading 
   

1956 births
Living people
American business writers
American chemical engineers
American commodities traders
American economics writers
American finance and investment writers
American financial analysts
American hedge fund managers
American investment advisors
American investors
American money managers
American stock traders
Clarkson University alumni
Stock and commodity market managers

20th-century American businesspeople